Mizérable may refer to:

Mizérable (EP), an EP by Gackt
Mizérable (song), a song by Gackt